Éditions Les 400 Coups is a French-language publisher of books for children. It was founded in 1995 and is based in Montréal, Québec, Canada.

In 2020, Les 400 Coups won the Bologna Prize for the Best Children's Publishers of the Year for North America.

References

Quebec comics
Comic book publishing companies of Canada
Companies based in Montreal
Publishing companies established in 1995
1995 establishments in Quebec